Acronia pulchella is a species of beetle in the family Cerambycidae. It was described by Arnold Schultze in 1922. It is known from the Philippines.

References

Acronia
Beetles described in 1922